Bertrum "Nate" Hunter (October 20, 1910 – April 25, 1948) was an American baseball pitcher in the Negro leagues. He played professionally from 1931 to 1936 with several teams. He pitched for the East in the inaugural East-West All-Star Game in 1933. Hunter played in Mexico, after his negro league career, until 1944.

References

External links

 and Baseball-Reference Black Baseball stats and Seamheads

1910 births
1948 deaths
Homestead Grays players
Akron Black Tyrites players
Kansas City Monarchs players
New York Cubans players
St. Louis Stars (baseball) players
Pittsburgh Crawfords players
Baseball players from Arizona
20th-century African-American sportspeople
Baseball pitchers